Legend is a demonstration album by the music production group Two Steps from Hell, originally released exclusively to clients in the motion picture and advertising industry for the purpose of licensing in May 2008. It consists of three discs: two CDs and a bonus DVD. The former contain a total of 37 principal tracks; 20 on disc one and 17 on disc two. The latter includes a large collection of alternative versions; therefore, in total, Legend consists of 77 tracks. They are predominantly composed by the group's founding members, Thomas J. Bergersen and Nick Phoenix, as well as some by Troels Folmann. The album was recorded by Capellen Orchestra in Prague, Czech Republic and at Capitol Studios in Los Angeles, United States. The cover artwork and the sleeve are designed by Steven R. Gilmore.

Some of the group's most successful tracks originate from this release, like "Heart of Courage", "Protectors of the Earth", and "Freedom Fighters"; a handful of such tracks were made available to the general public on subsequent commercial albums, starting with Invincible (2010). In 2019, the album was finally released to the public, albeit modified to consist of only the tracks which had still not yet been made commercially available and under the title of Legend Anthology.

Track listing
Below is the original track listing.

The public re-issue of the album as Legend Anthology was released on 1 November 2019. Its listing is different to the original – it is of all the remaining tracks (bar five) which, until its release, were still unavailable for public purchase and arranged in alphabetical order; tracks which had already been released to the public on other commercial albums were excluded. Therefore, Legend Anthology features 59 tracks and has a total length of 2:07:03.

CD 1 – "Epic drama"

CD 2 – "Drama"

Critical reception
IFMCA-associated reviews website, MundoBSO, rated it six out of ten stars.

The editorial team at the Remote Control Productions and Hans Zimmer-affiliated fansite, hans-zimmer.com, rated it four out of five stars.

Charts
As a demo, the album was not available for public purchase and therefore unable to enter any charts.

However, the re-release of the album as Legend Anthology in 2019 was a public offering and did chart as follows:

Use in media

Two Steps From Hell's music has been featured frequently in movie trailers and promotional campaigns.
 Freedom Fighters and Down with the Enterprise were used in trailers for the 2009 Star Trek movie.
 Heart of Courage was used in the trailer for The Chronicles of Narnia: The Voyage of the Dawn Treader as well as in TV spots for the DVD of Avatar, the TV shows Camelot, Frozen Planet, The Pacific, and Revolution, the Greek reality show Survivor, and the video game Mass Effect 2. It is also the intro theme for Nathan for You and all games of UEFA Euro 2012. It was used in TV commercials for the Ferrari FF, Tod's. and reed.co.uk It was used for US World Champion gymnast Alicia Sacramone's 2011 floor routine. This song was also used in an episode of The Innovators: The Men Who Built America as well as in the series The World Wars the "Nooice" sketch by Key & Peele, and in the 2021 Major League Baseball All-Star Game during MasterCard’s Stand Up to Cancer tribute. 
 ASAP was used in the trailer for series 1 of Sherlock and numerous films including Indiana Jones and the Kingdom of the Crystal Skull, The Mummy: Tomb of the Dragon Emperor, No Country for Old Men, WALL-E, Horton Hears a Who!, The Chronicles of Narnia: Prince Caspian, The Happening, Hellboy II: The Golden Army, The Incredible Hulk, Speed Racer, Jumper, and Valkyrie.
 Fill My Heart was used in the international trailer for The Young Victoria, a commercial for The Help, and a TV spot for the 3D re-release of Beauty and the Beast.
 Protectors of the Earth was used in the trailer for Inkheart and a featurette titled "Gringott's and Goblins" for Harry Potter and the Deathly Hallows – Part 2, as well as an ad for the second half of the 6th series of Doctor Who and ads for Thundercats. It was also used in the 6th episode of the third season of Blue Mountain State and is the title music for Vietnam in HD. Additionally, it was also used in the official launch trailer of Mass Effect 3 and for the presentation of the new stadium of A.E.K. Athens F.C.
 Infinite Legends was used in the theatrical trailer for Breaking Dawn – Part 1 and for a trailer for the Merlin TV series.
 Calamity was used in the Killzone 3 Justice Trailer.
 Calamity (Remix) was used in a teaser for The Twilight Saga: Eclipse.
 Undying Love was used in the "Nooice" sketch by Key & Peele.
 Destiny of Mankind was used in the Batman: Arkham Asylum Villain trailer.
 Forces of Destiny was used in an episode of The Innovators: The Men Who Built America.
Call To Arms was used in "Magical Negro Fight" sketch by Key & Peele and in the Vegas Golden Knights 2017–18 pregame introductions in the Stanley Cup playoffs.

References

External links

2008 albums
Two Steps from Hell albums